Briers is a surname. Notable people with the surname include:

Lee Briers (born 1978), Welsh rugby league player
Lucy Briers (born 1967), English actress
Mark Briers (born 1968), former English cricketer
Nigel Briers (born 1955), former English cricketer
Norman Briers (born 1947), former English cricketer
Richard Briers (1934–2013), English actor
Stephen Briers, British clinical psychologist

See also
Brier (surname)